KylieX2008 is the 2008 DVD and Blu-ray Disc release of Kylie Minogue's tenth concert tour of the same name. The film features the entire concert (shot in Super 16 format) along with a documentary, stage backdrop projections, conceptual designs, and a photo gallery.  Shot on 16mm film the Blu-ray release received comments regarding a grainy picture quality, due to 16mm not being suitable for HD TV.

Track listing

Special Features

Charts

References

External links
Minogue's official website

Kylie Minogue video albums
Live video albums
2008 video albums
Kylie Minogue live albums
2008 live albums